Rubio Yovani Méndez Rubín (born 1 March 1996) is a professional footballer who plays as a forward for Major League Soccer club Real Salt Lake. Born in the United States, he represents the Guatemala national team.

Club career

Youth
Rubin attended Whitford Middle School in Beaverton, Oregon. He started his youth career at Westside Metros and played at Beaverton High School.

Senior
Rubin signed a four-year deal with FC Utrecht upon turning eighteen in March 2014. Rubin started, played the full 90 minutes and recorded an assist in his professional debut for Utrecht on 17 August 2014, in a 2–1 victory over Willem II.

He won the Beloften Eredivisie in 2015–16 with Jong FC Utrecht.

Rubin signed with Silkeborg IF of the Danish Superliga in January 2017 after being released from FC Utrecht.

After his departure from Silkeborg, Rubin signed with Stabæk for the remainder of the 2017 season.

Rubin joined Liga MX side Club Tijuana in February 2018. After mostly playing on loan with Tijuana's affiliate Dorados, Rubin joined San Diego Loyal in September 2020.

On 7 January 2021, Rubin joined MLS side Real Salt Lake.

International career

United States
A former United States under-17 player, Rubin in 2012 was named U.S. Soccer Young Male Athlete of the Year.

Rubin was eligible to play for Guatemala, Mexico, or the United States. He joined the United States team for the match against the Czech Republic on 3 September 2014.
He earned his first cap when he started on 14 November 2014, in a 2–1 defeat against Colombia, narrowly failing to score a header in the second half and attracting praise from manager Jürgen Klinsmann.

Guatemala
Following a one-time switch earlier in the year, Rubin made his debut for Guatemala in a 2–0 Nations League defeat to French Guiana on 2 June 2022.

Personal life
Rubio was born to a Mexican father and a Guatemalan mother.

Career statistics

International

Honours
Individual
MLS Goal of the Year: 2021

References

External links

1996 births
Living people
Sportspeople from Beaverton, Oregon
American people of Guatemalan descent
American sportspeople of North American descent
Sportspeople of Guatemalan descent
American sportspeople of Mexican descent
American soccer players
American expatriate soccer players
FC Utrecht players
Association football forwards
Soccer players from Oregon
Expatriate footballers in the Netherlands
American expatriate sportspeople in the Netherlands
Eredivisie players
United States men's youth international soccer players
United States men's under-20 international soccer players
United States men's under-23 international soccer players
United States men's international soccer players
Expatriate footballers in Norway
American expatriate sportspeople in Norway
Eliteserien players
Silkeborg IF players
Stabæk Fotball players
Club Tijuana footballers
Dorados de Sinaloa footballers
Liga MX players
Expatriate footballers in Mexico
USL Championship players
San Diego Loyal SC players
Real Salt Lake players
Major League Soccer players
Guatemalan footballers
Guatemala international footballers
Dual internationalists (football)